Hiebara Dam is a gravity dam located in Shimane Prefecture in Japan. The dam is used for irrigation. The catchment area of the dam is 4.6 km2. The dam impounds about 9  ha of land when full and can store 1210 thousand cubic meters of water. The construction of the dam was started on 1980 and completed in 2004.

References

Dams in Shimane Prefecture
2004 establishments in Japan